"Before the Fall" is third and final single from the album Another Animal by the American heavy metal band of the same name. The single was released as a promotional single and garnered barely any radio play, therefore charting poorly.

Singles 

Billboard (North America)

2008 singles
American hard rock songs
2007 songs
Songs written by Whitfield Crane
Songs written by Tony Rombola
Universal Music Group singles